Institute of Physical Education Chonburi Campus Stadium  or  IPE Chonburi Stadium  is a sports stadium located on the Institute of Physical Education Chonburi Campus in Mueang Chonburi District, Chonburi Province, Thailand. The stadium holds 11,000 people.  It is currently used mostly for football matches; it is the former home stadium of Pattaya United F.C. and Chonburi F.C.  It is fitted with floodlights, enabling evening matches to be played. The stadium also has a running track, as do most stadiums in Thailand.

References

Chonburi F.C.
Football venues in Thailand
Sport in Chonburi province
Buildings and structures in Chonburi province
2010 establishments in Thailand
Sports venues completed in 2010